Wang Jiao (Chinese: 王峤; Pinyin: Wáng Jiào; born 26 March 1995) is a Chinese football player who currently plays for Chongqing Liangjiang Athletic, on loan from Sichuan Jiuniu in the Chinese Super League.

Club career
Wang Jiao started his professional football career in 2013 when he was promoted to Liaoning Youth's squad for the 2013 China League Two. He moved to Chinese Super League side Liaoning Whowin in the summer of 2013. On 7 August 2013, he made his debut for Liaoning in the quarter-finals of 2013 Chinese FA Cup which Liaoning lost to Guizhou Renhe 4–0. Wang made his Super League debut on 18 September 2016 in a 6–2 away defeat against Guangzhou Evergrande, coming on as a substitute for Zhang Tianlong in the 68th minute.

At the end of the 2017 Chinese Super League, Wang would be part of the squad that was relegated. After a season he was loaned to third tier football club Sichuan Jiuniu where he would help them win promotion. He would go on to make the move permanent after his loan expired.

Career statistics 
.

References

External links
 

1995 births
Living people
Chinese footballers
Association football midfielders
People from Tieling
Footballers from Liaoning
Liaoning F.C. players
Sichuan Jiuniu F.C. players
China League Two players
China League One players
Chinese Super League players